Behnam Maleki (born 2 December 1992) is an Iranian former professional cyclist.

Major results

2010
 1st  Road race, National Junior Road Championships
 1st Overall Tour of Mazandaran
1st Stage 2
2014
 3rd Road race, National Road Championships
2015
 1st  Road race, National Road Championships
 1st Stage 5 Tour de Singkarak
 8th Overall Tour of Yancheng Coastal Wetlands

References

External links

1992 births
Living people
Iranian male cyclists
21st-century Iranian people